The Rolex Grand Slam of Show Jumping, is a unique initiative, which unites the four Major tournaments:

 The World Equestrian Festival, CHIO Aachen, Germany (Stadium, footing: grass)
 The CSIO Spruce Meadows “Masters” in Calgary, Alberta, Canada (Stadium, footing: grass)
 The CHI Geneva in Switzerland (Indoor arena, footing: sand)
 The Dutch Masters in 's-Hertogenbosch in Netherlands (Indoor arena, footing: sand) (as of 2018)

In order to win the Grand Slam, a rider has to win the Grand Prix at the four shows in direct succession. On 13 September 2015, Scott Brash became the first rider to ever win the Grand Slam.

With Hello Sanctos, he consecutively won the three Majors at the CHI Geneva 2014, the CHIO Aachen 2015 and Spruce Meadows “Masters” Calgary 2015.

Foundation

The four Majors united 
Together with Rolex, the organisers of the CHIO Aachen, the CSIO Spruce Meadows “Masters” and the CHI Geneva developed the Grand Slam of Show Jumping. It is based on the world-famous tennis and golf Grand Slams – a successful concept that didn’t exist in the field of show jumping hitherto, although it must be stated that the three equestrian shows have been highly appreciated by the riders for decades because of their unique tradition and excellent quality. Together they unite 250 years of sporting history. They are attended by  visitors and 1,300 media representatives in total every year, benefit from a huge media presence and an infrastructure of the highest quality.

In 2018, The Dutch Masters of Den Bosch (NED) becomes the fourth Grand Slam event.

Sponsor 
Rolex is the founding and title sponsor of the Grand Slam.

Presentation to the public and to the media 
The Grand Slam of Show Jumping was presented to the public and to the media in Gothenburg, Sweden on April 26, 2013 – accompanied by the remark that there is the option of increasing the number of participating equestrian sport events up to five in total. The announcement regarding the addition of the Dutch Masters was done in Den Bosch on March 12, 2017.

Young talent 
The targeted fostering of young talent is also a part of the Rolex Grand Slam. Two young riders are invited to each of the four Majors – in order to gain experience on the top level of our sport.

Steering Committee 
The Steering committee is composed of the organisers of the four Majors of the Rolex Grand Slam of Show Jumping. The actual president of the Steering Committee is Linda Southern-Heathcott from Spruce Meadows

The four Majors of the Grand Slam

The CHIO Aachen, Germany 

Every year, more than  visitors travel to the prestigious showgrounds of the Aachen Soers, where the best equestrian sport athletes in the world compete against each other in five disciplines – show jumping, dressage, eventing, four-in-hand driving and vaulting. Worldwide over 400 journalists do coverage on the show, which offers the visitors a unique programme beyond the sporting competitions. The German TV channels, ARD, ZDF and WDR broadcast more than 30 hours of coverage on the competitions of the traditional show that was founded in 1898.

Key Facts

The CSIO Spruce Meadows “Masters” in Calgary, Alberta, Canada 

The site, which is completely owned by the Southern family, is the venue for the most diversified equestrian sport event in the world. From junior level, to the amateur league, through to the elite – Spruce Meadows unites all classes of the equestrian sport in a breath-taking location spanning 225 hectares and offers ideal conditions for 1,000 horses thanks to its seven competition sites and two stadiums.
Since 1976, more than 15 top-level show jumping competitions have been staged at Spruce Meadows. When the Spruce Meadows “Masters” begins, the equestrian sport world watches the best show-jumpers on the planet. The world elite compete against each other from Wednesday to Sunday, striving to achieve top placings and international recognition.

Key Facts

The CHI Geneva, Switzerland 

Founded in 1926, the CHI Geneva is one of the most prestigious equestrian events in the world and the indoor equestrian show with the longest history. Every year the CHI unites the riders of the planet at the Palexpo, which spanning 5,200 m² is the largest indoor arena in the world: Voted the best equestrian sport show worldwide six times, the CHI of Geneva has staged two World Cup Finals (1996 and 2010) and ten Rolex IJRC Top Ten Finals. The “Défi des Champions©“, presented by Rolex, is a further highlight of the event.
The organisers of the CHI Geneva also organised Switzerland’s first and only Indoor Cross competition. Some of the biggest names in the eventing sport competed at the premiere in the year 2014. The only Swiss World Cup leg in four-in-hand driving is also staged in Geneva.
Every year, 700 motivated and enthusiastic volunteers help at the event, which attracts 41,000 spectators over the four days. More than 220 media representatives are present at the Palexpo, around 30 TV channels from all five continents broadcast coverage of the event.

Key Facts

The Dutch Masters in 's-Hertogenbosch, Netherlands 
The Dutch Masters is the most important show in Netherlands. In 1994, the World Cup Final of show jumping was staged in Den Bosch for the first time, in 2012 the Dutch Masters, indeed hosted the Finals for both dressage and jumping. Every year, 65,000 visitors attend the traditional show in the heart of the Netherlands which has celebrated its 50th anniversary in 2017.

Key Facts

Financial facts and bonus 
The financial framework conditions of the World Equestrian Festival, CHIO Aachen, the Spruce Meadows “Masters“ and the CHI Geneva are impressive.

The overall prize-money of the three Rolex Grand Prix totals more than 3 mil. Euros. Furthermore, there is a chance to win the following bonuses:
 If a rider wins the Grand Slam (victory in all four Grand Prix in succession), he receives a bonus of  million Euros.
 If a rider wins three Grand Prix in succession, he receives a bonus of  million Euros.
 If a rider wins two Grand Prix in succession, he receives a bonus of  Euros.
 If a rider wins two Grand Prix in the same cycle (“two out of three mode”), he receives a bonus of  Euros.

A rider can compete in the Grand Prix with different horses. The rider’s “personal” Grand Slam starts with the first victory, the calendar year is not decisive here. The cycle of the Rolex Grand Slam of Show Jumping is infinite. A rider has to take part in all three legs of the cycle in order to qualify for a bonus.

The winners of the Grand Slam competitions so far

CHIO Aachen 
 2013 : Nick Skelton (GBR) and Big Star 
 2014 : Christian Ahlmann (GER) and Codex One
 2015 : Scott Brash (GBR) and Hello Sanctos
 2016 : Philipp Weishaupt (GER) and L.B. Convall
 2017 : Grégory Wathelet (BEL) and Corée
 2018 : Marcus Ehning (GER) and Prêt à Tout
 2019 : Kent Farrington (USA) and Gazelle

Spruce Meadows « Masters » Calgary 
 2013 : Pieter Devos (BEL) and Candy 
 2014 : Ian Millar (CAN) and Dixson
 2015 : Scott Brash (GBR) and Hello Sanctos 
 2016 : Scott Brash (GBR) and Ursula
 2017 : Philipp Weishaupt (GER) and L.B. Convall
 2018 : Sameh El Dahan (EGY) and Suma's Zorro
 2019 : Beezie Madden (USA) and Darry Lou

CHI Geneva 
 2013 : Steve Guerdat (SUI) and Nino des Buissonnets 
 2014 : Scott Brash (GBR) and Hello Sanctos
 2015 : Steve Guerdat (SUI) and Nino des Buissonnets
 2016 : Pedro Veniss (BRA) and Quabri de l'Isle
 2017 : Kent Farrington (USA) and Gazelle
 2018 : Marcus Ehning (GER) and Prêt à Tout
 2018 : Martin Fuchs (SUI) and Clooney 51

The Dutch Masters 
 2018 : Niels Bruynseels (BEL) and Gancia de Muze
 2019 : Henrik von Eckermann (SWE) and Toveks Mary Lou
 2021 : Max Kühner (AUT) and Electric Blue P

The trophy of the Grand Slam of Show Jumping 
The trophy of the Rolex Grand Slam, a cup made out of sterling silver with double scrolled handles was designed by the famous London jewellers Garrard that was founded in 1735. Standing on a silver plinth, a delicate ribbed spiral stem curves around the middle section moving up towards a tulip-shaped vessel with a lid. The overall height of the trophy is 45 cm and it weighs 2 kilogrammes. The front of the trophy is decorated with the logo of the Rolex Grand Slam, which was hand engraved. The trophy was designed by Corinna Pike, designer of the royal crown jewels. Her aim was to incorporate curved forms inspired by the natural world and achieve the highest degree of harmony in design. Garrard is the oldest jewellers in the world and is renowned as a jeweller who serves royalty. As well as designing jewellery for governments and royalty around the globe, Garrard hat also created trophies for a number of world-class sporting events – such as the Rolex Grand Slam.

Rolex and the equestrian sport 
As the most famous partner of the equestrian sport for over half a century, Rolex is proud to be part of this historic initiative and to promote top performances in the equestrian sport even more intensively. Rolex has actively been supporting the equestrian sport for years, particularly the three Major shows, which together form the Grand Slam.  This is why the organisers invited the Swiss brand to become the exclusive partner.

References 

Equestrian sports competitions